San Jose Sports & Entertainment Enterprises (SJSEE) is a privately-held company based in San Jose, California which owns the San Jose Sharks of the National Hockey League, the San Jose Barracuda of the American Hockey League, and oversees all areas of operation and management of the city-owned SAP Center at San Jose, the premier sports and entertainment venue in Santa Clara County.

Investors 
SJSEE, is currently owned by Sharks Owner, German businessman, and Philanthropist Dr. Hasso Plattner. Plattner also serves as the team’s representative on the National Hockey League’s Board of Governors.

History 
SJSEE was formed in 2002 by former Sharks owners George Gund III and brother Gordon Gund. In October, 2011, the Gund's sold SJSEE to a group of local investors assembled by former Sharks President Greg Jamison which included Plattner, Kevin Compton, a partner at Kleiner Perkins, and Stratton Sclavos, former Chairman and CEO of VeriSign. In 2014, Plattner purchased the ownership shares of both Compton and Sclavos and subsequently bought the remaining shares owned by former San Jose mayor Tom McEnery, E. Floyd Kvamme, and Harvey Armstrong to become the franchise’s majority owner. 

Other former investors include former San Francisco 49ers player Brent Jones, venture capitalist Boots Del Biaggio, and former Brocade Communications Systems CEO Gregory Reyes. George Gund III maintained a minority stake in the team until his death in 2013.

References

National Hockey League owners
 
2002 establishments in California
Companies based in San Jose, California
Entertainment companies established in 2002
Sports holding companies of the United States